Westmount Centre is a shopping mall located in the Woodcroft neighborhood of Edmonton. It opened in 1955 and is owned by First Capital Realty.

Anchors

 Safeway
 The Home Depot (opened 2008 in former Blockbuster and Scotiabank locations)
 Dollarama
 Shoppers Drug Mart
 Ace Liquor Discounter (rebranded from Liquor Depot when some locations rebranded)

Former anchors
 Walmart - opened 2012 in former Zellers, closed October 19, 2022 and relocated to Kingsway Mall in all of the first floor of its former Sears and part of the second floor
 Liquor Depot (rebranded to Ace Liquor Discounter when some locations rebranded)
 Blockbuster - original location replaced by The Home Depot in 2008, 2nd location closed in 2011, and is now Ultracuts and PetValu
 Zellers - former Woodward's, closed in 2012 and replaced with Walmart the same year
 Woodward's - replaced by Zellers
 Sahara Theatre/Westmount Centre Cinemas - opened as the independent Sahara on January 13, 1956, taken over by Famous Players and reopened as the Westmount on August 12, 1965, twinned in 1972 and closed in 1987 
 Famous Players Westmount 4 (later Empire Theatres Westmount) - opened November 8, 1985, taken over by Empire Theatres in 2005 and closed February 27, 2011
 Cineplex Odeon Westmount 4 - opened December 20, 1985, closed in 2000
 Gold's Gym - formerly ice rink, closed in 2017, reopened briefly as Crunch Fitness and closed

Layout

References

External links

Shopping malls in Edmonton